Fenton is an unincorporated community in Big Horn and Park counties in the U.S. state of Wyoming.

References

Unincorporated communities in Big Horn County, Wyoming
Unincorporated communities in Wyoming